The BRP Iwak (LC-289) is a heavy landing craft of the Philippine Navy. It was decommissioned in December 2012, was stored until it was sold by the Australian government to the Philippine Navy to assist in improving the country's Humaritarian and Disaster Relief capabilities.

Prior to commissioning with the Philippine Navy, the ship, together with the former HMAS Betano and HMAS Balikpapan, underwent refurbishing, refit, and servicing works in Cebu for a few months.

The ship was commissioned to Philippine Navy, together with 2 other sisterships and a new landing platform dock, on 1 June 2016 in Manila.

See also
 HMAS Wewak (L 130)
 List of ships of the Philippine Navy

References

External links
Philippine Navy Official website
Naming and Code Designation of PN Ships

Balikpapan-class landing craft heavy of the Philippine Navy
Ships built in Queensland
1972 ships